Leonardo da Silva (born February 18, 1987) is a Brazilian professional football player.

Club career

Vista Hermosa
In 2009, Da Silva signed with Vista Hermosa of El Salvador.

On 6 July 2010, Vista Hermosa released him from his contract after he failed to return from his vacation in Brazil. However midway through the season Vista Hermosa recalled him back to join the squad again.

Alianza FC
He was released from Vista Hermosa after the Clausura 2011 tournament and joined Alianza for the Apertura 2011.

Isidro Metapán
Da Silva signed with Isidro Metapán in 2012, reaching the Clausura 2012 final, but they were defeated by Águila.

References

External links
 
 Leonardo da Silva at playmakerstats.com (English version of ceroacero.es)

1987 births
Living people
Brazilian footballers
Expatriate footballers in El Salvador
C.D. Vista Hermosa footballers
Alianza F.C. footballers
A.D. Isidro Metapán footballers
Expatriate footballers in Thailand
Association football forwards